Youssef Fertout (born 7 July 1970) is a retired Moroccan footballer. He played for several clubs, including Wydad Casablanca, CF Belenenses and AZ Alkmaar.

Fertout played for the Morocco national football team and was a participant at the 1998 African Cup of Nations.

Honours
CAF Champions League (1):
1992
Botola (3):
1990, 1991, 1993
Moroccan Throne Cup (2):
1989, 1994

References

1970 births
Moroccan footballers
Morocco international footballers
1998 African Cup of Nations players
Botola players
AZ Alkmaar players
Association football forwards
Living people